Weightlifting at the 2005 Southeast Asian Games was held in the Luxur Place in Bacolod, Negros Occidental, Philippines.

Medal table

Medalists

Men

Women

Games Records
 Men – 85 kg: Indonesia' Sandow Weldemar Nasution, Score:334 (146-188)
(previous record of ?)
 Women – 63 kg.: Thailand's Wanee Kameaim, Score:230 (100-130)
(previous record of ?)
 Men – 94 kg.: Thailand's' Khunchai Nuchpum, Score:346 (155-191)
(previous record of ?)
 Women – 69 kg: Thailand's' Pawina Thongsuk, Score:257 (115-142)
(previous record of ?)
 Women - 75 kg: Myanmar's' Mya Sanda Oo, Score:240(107-133)
(previous record of 232.5 (102.5-130) was set in 2003 Myanmar's Cho Cho Win)
 Men - 105+ kg.: Malaysia's' Che Mod Azrol Che Mat, Score:350 (160*-190)
(previous record of 155 was set in 2003 Thailand's Nupadol Wandwang)

External links
Southeast Asian Games Official Results

2005 Southeast Asian Games events
Southeast Asian Games
2005
International weightlifting competitions hosted by the Philippines